Bluffton is a town in southern Beaufort County, South Carolina, United States. The population as of the 2020 census was 27,716, an increase of over 120% since 2010, making it one of the fastest growing municipalities in South Carolina. Bluffton is the fifth largest municipality in South Carolina by land area. It is primarily located around U.S. Route 278, between Hilton Head Island and Interstate 95. The Lowcountry town's original one square mile area, now known as Old Town, is situated on a bluff along the May River. The town is a primary town within the Hilton Head Island–Bluffton metropolitan area.

After the Tariff of 1842, Bluffton became a hotbed of separatist sentiment, which in turn led to a protest against federal taxes called the Bluffton Movement in 1844. Even though the movement quickly died out, it somewhat contributed to the secession movement that led to South Carolina being the first state to leave the Union. In the Antebellum Period, Bluffton became a popular location for wealthy merchants and plantation owners. During the Civil War, two thirds of the town was destroyed by fire during the Union's Bluffton Expedition on June 4, 1863.

History

Colonial era (1670–1776) 
During the 17th and the 18th centuries, the area comprising southern Beaufort County was known as Granville County of St. Luke's Parish. The Yamasee people were invited to settle in the area by Lord Cardoss, leader of the nearby Scottish settlement in Beaufort. The Yamasee established ten towns with over 1,200 inhabitants in the area. In 1715, the Yamasee War broke out, and after several years of fighting, the Yamasee migrated to Florida, opening the "Indian Lands" to European settlement. In 1718, the Lords Proprietors carved the area into several new baronies, including the Devil's Elbow Barony that contained the future town of Bluffton. The first titled owner of the land was the Barbadian planter Sir John Colleton. Following the departure of the Yamasee people, colonists began building plantations in the Bluffton area in 1728. The Colletons prospered by growing cotton, corn and indigo.

American Revolution (1776–1785) 
Before his death in 1776, Sir John Colleton (grandson of the original owner) developed plantations near Victoria Bluff - Foot Point areas and later disposed of much of his barony, much of it bought by the Rose and Kirk families. These plantations were destroyed by the British under General Prévost in 1779. During the 18th century, much of the land south of the May River (now known as Palmetto Bluff) was covered with rice fields. Rice became a lucrative crop and a part of lowcountry culture until the early 20th century when it was disrupted by a series of devastating storms.

Antebellum era (1785–1861) 

The town of Bluffton was eventually built on two adjoining parcels in the Devil's Elbow Barony purchased by Benjamin Walls and James Kirk. The first homes were constructed during the early 1800s by area plantation owners seeking the high ground and cool river breezes as an escape from the unhealthy conditions present on Lowcountry rice and cotton plantations. Easy access by water provided more incentive for expansion, and the many tidal coves afforded excellent locations for residences. The community was originally known as "Kirk's Landing" or "Kirk's Bluff" as shown in Mill's Atlas of 1825. The first streets were formally laid out during the 1830s and the name of Bluffton decided upon in the early 1840s as a compromise between the Kirk and Pope families.

The first South Carolina secession movement began under what is now known as the Secession Oak tree, led by Robert Barnwell Rhett on July 31, 1844. In the 1850s, a steamboat landing was built at the end of Calhoun Street, and Bluffton became the commercial center of southern Beaufort County as a stopover for travelers between Savannah and Beaufort. In 1852, the town was officially incorporated by an act of the South Carolina General Assembly and comprised approximately one square mile. The iconic Church of the Cross was designed by architect Edward Brickell White to seat up to 600 parishioners at a cost of $5,000, and construction began in 1854. On July 17, 1857, the first services were held at the Church of the Cross.

Civil War (1861–1865) 
After a Union victory at the Battle of Port Royal on November 7, 1861, Confederate Brigadier-General Thomas F. Drayton directed the evacuation of rebel forces from Hilton Head Island to the Bluffton mainland. Occupying Port Royal Harbor, the Union's South Atlantic Blockading Squadron could then be monitored from rebel lookouts dispersed from Bluffton's substantial picket headquarters. Bluffton's location resulted in it being the only strategic position on the East Coast at which the Confederates could gather direct intelligence on the Union squadron. That was conducting crucial blockade operations along the southern coastline. In late May 1863, Major-General David Hunter, Commander of the Department of the South, ordered the destruction of Bluffton by fire. The Union "Expedition against Bluffton" was carried out on June 4, 1863, destroying approximately two thirds of the town's estimated 60 structures. Only the town's two churches and fifteen residences remained standing after the attack. Eight antebellum homes and two churches still exist in Old Town and highlight the town's nationally popular registered historic district.

Postbellum era (1865–1945) 

Rebuilding came slowly, as few local landowners could still afford the luxury of a summer home in Bluffton. The town did not experience a true rebuilding until the 1880s, when it emerged as a commercial center for Beaufort County.

Contemporary era (1945–present) 

Bluffton remained a commercial center until Coastal Highway (US 17) and the bridge at Port Wentworth over the Savannah River were completed, which made riverboat trade and travel less attractive. The Great Depression began shortly thereafter and brought the closure of the town's prosperity and commercial importance. The popularity of Bluffton as a vacation spot remained even after its loss of commercial stature. The development of Hilton Head Island, nearby Sun City and the related development in the 1990s caused a resurgence of commercial activity in the town. In 1996, Bluffton was designated a National Historic District with 46 contributing buildings and two contributing sites. In 1998, the Heyward House opened to the public by the Bluffton Historical Preservation Society. In 1999, the Heyward House was part of the Save America's Treasures program. The Heyward House became the town's welcome center in 2000, and the Old Town Bluffton historic district was established through zoning regulations and architectural standards. In 2005, Bluffton was recognized as a Preserve America Community, a federal program that encourages community efforts to preserve the nation's cultural and historical assets.

Altamaha Town, Bluffton Historic District, Church of the Cross, and Rose Hill Plantation House are listed on the National Register of Historic Places.

Geography 

Bluffton was once mostly wetlands, many of which were drained possibly during the antebellum era. Agriculture and pine timber harvesting contributed to the landscape still present today. The town proper consists of five primary areas. The historic district of Old Town, on the northern bluff of the May River; Palmetto Bluff, located on the southern side of the May River; Jones Estate, situated along the New River; Buckwalter, located on the northwest side of town; and Shultz Tract, north of Old Town. The May River winds through the center of town. The New River forms the southwest boundary of the town.

Topography
Bluffton is the fifth largest municipality in South Carolina by land area. The municipal boundary contains many large "doughnut holes" of unincorporated territory due to South Carolina's strict annexation laws. Most of Bluffton was undeveloped land until the housing boom of the early 2000s, which led to explosive growth in Bluffton's area. Many of Bluffton's planned unit developments were built during this time. As of 2012 many of these developments remain only partially complete due to the economic downturn.

Climate 
Bluffton has a humid subtropical climate (Köppen Cfa), with very mild winters, hot, humid summers, and significant rainfall all year long. August is the wettest month; almost half of the annual rainfall occurs during the summer months in the form of thundershowers. Fall remains relatively warm through November. Winter is short and mild, and is characterized by occasional rain. Snow flurries rarely occur. Hurricanes are a major threat to the area during the summer and early fall but there has not been a major hurricane event in Bluffton since the Category 3 Sea Islands Hurricane in 1893.

Demographics

2020 census

As of the 2020 United States census, there were 27,716 people, 7,560 households, and 5,402 families residing in the town.

2010 census
The population density was 244.2 people per square mile (94.3/km2). There were 5,393 housing units at an average density of 105.1 per square mile (40.6/km2).

The town of Bluffton grew 882.7% between the 2000 and 2010 census, making it the fastest growing municipality in South Carolina with a population over 2,500. Housing units grew 976.4%.

The racial makeup of the town was 71.4% White, 16.1% African American, 0.3% Native American, 2.0% Asian, <0.1% Pacific Islander, 7.3% from other races, and 2.9% from two or more races. Hispanic or Latino of any race were 18.8% of the population.

There were 4,417 households, out of which 54.0% had children under the age of 18 living with them, 61.9% were married couples living together, 13.3% had a female householder with no husband present, and 26.4% were non-families. 18.4% of all households were made up of individuals, and 4.1% had someone living alone who was 65 years of age or older. The average household size was 2.84 and the average family size was 3.20.

In the town, the population was spread out, with 28.9% under the age of 18, 6.8% from 18 to 24, 35.5% from 25 to 44, 21.5% from 45 to 64, and 7.3% who were 65 years of age or older. The median age was 32.7 years. For every 100 females, there were 95.5 males. For every 100 females age 18 and over, there were 93.4 males. Estimated household income for 2009 was $53,386, the estimated median house value was $237,868, median gross rent was $1,179.

Bluffton is a principal city in the Hilton Head Island-Bluffton-Beaufort, SC Metropolitan Statistical Area, which includes Beaufort and Jasper counties. As of 2014, the MSA had an estimated year-round population of 203,022.

Economy 
Long a stopover between Hilton Head and Savannah, Bluffton has become a tourist destination in its own right with a large number of hotels, restaurants and shopping areas such as Tanger Outlets. The Inn at Palmetto Bluff has received a number of awards including Best Hotel in the Country by U.S. News & World Report and Condé Nast Traveler Gold List World's Best Places to Stay, January 2011. Higher education is an important sector in the local economy, with institutions such as the  University of South Carolina Beaufort Hilton Head Gateway Campus and Technical College of the Lowcountry nearby. An eclectic art destination, Bluffton has several art galleries located along Calhoun Street. Bluffton is home to South Carolina's last full-time oyster shucking business, Bluffton Oyster Co, which first opened in 1899 at the end of Wharf Street on the banks of the May River.

Arts and culture

Society of Bluffton Artists
The Society of Bluffton Artists is a nonprofit organization established in 1999.

May River Theatre
The May River Theatre is a theatre company that has performances at the Ulmer Auditorium in downtown Bluffton.

Annual events

 Bluffton Village Festival - Also known as "Mayfest", the Bluffton Village Festival is an annual event that started in the spring of 1978. It gathers local artisans and musicians to showcase a variety of goods as a "celebration of Bluffton life" and local culture.
 Christmas Parade - An annual parade that takes place at the beginning of December and features a wide variety of unique parade floats both local and regional.
 Historic Bluffton Arts & Seafood Festival - A fall festival that consists of many events and activities including an art show, kayak tours, a 5K run, and sampling of locally harvested seafood.
 Shag & Drag - Classic car show and live entertainment, held in June.
 May River Cleanup - Every year hundreds of volunteers organize to help remove trash and waste from nearly 12 miles of river and to help raise awareness of the challenges facing the May River.

Museums, historical sites and other attractions 
Historic buildings, art and historical museums include:
 Heyward House and Historical Center
 Church of the Cross
 Squire Pope Carriage House
 Allen-Lockwood House
 Huger-Gordon House
 Seven Oaks, Bluffton SC
 Fripp-Lowden House
 The Store, Bluffton SC
 Carson Cottage
 D. Hasell Heyward House
 Patz Brothers House
 Planters Mercantile
 Cordray House
 Campbell Chapel African Methodist Episcopal Church

Parks and recreation 
Bluffton has many parks and recreational activities. For cycling, Bluffton Parkway and Buckwalter Parkway have bicycle paths on both sides of the road and Bluffton Rd has a bicycle lane from US-278 until the intersection with May River Rd. The following links will display the location of the park in an external web mapping application.

 Beaufort County Parks & Recreation Bluffton Pool - Indoor swimming pool with lanes
 Buckwalter Regional Park - Soccer fields and skateboard park
 Buckwalter Trail - Wraps around Buckwalter Place
 DuBois Park - Playground and swings
 New River Trailhead Park - Nature trail
 MC Riley Sports Complex - Basketball and baseball
 Oscar Frazier Park - Playground, soccer fields and baseball parks
 Oyster Factory Park
 Pritchard Park
 Bluffton Recreation Center - Tennis, soccer, youth football, playground

Boat landings
 Oyster Factory Boat Landing - Access to the May River
 H.E. Trask Boat Landing - Access to the Colleton River
 Calhoun St. Boat Dock - Access to the May River
 Alljoy Boat Landing - Access to the May River

Government 
Bluffton has a Council-Manager form of government. The town council is responsible for the legislative function of the municipality such as establishing policy, passing local ordinances, voting appropriations, and developing an overall vision. The town has a Mayor and Mayor Pro-Tem position. The council has four at-large members who serve overlapping four-year terms. Town elections take place every two years in the fall.

Education 
Bluffton is served by the Beaufort County School District. The local public schools include:

 Bluffton High School
 May River High School
 H.E. McCracken Middle School
 River Ridge Academy
 Bluffton Middle School
 Bluffton Elementary School
 M.C. Riley Elementary School
 Pritchardville Elementary School
 Red Cedar Elementary School

There are also a number of independent schools, including Cross Schools (K-8), May River Montessori (K-5), Christian Heritage Montessori (K-5), and Saint Gregory the Great Catholic School (K-8). Public institutions of higher education in Bluffton include the University of South Carolina Beaufort South Campus and the Technical College of the Lowcountry.

Bluffton has a public library, a branch of the Beaufort County Library.

Infrastructure

Utilities
Water and sewer service is provided by Beaufort-Jasper Water and Sewer Authority (BJWSA). South Carolina Electric and Gas Company (SCE&G) and Palmetto Electric Cooperative are the major suppliers of power to the town. Hargray provides telephone and broadband services. Waste Management, Inc provides solid waste services.

Transportation

Airport 
Bluffton is served by the Savannah/Hilton Head International Airport , which is located in Savannah, Georgia, and the Hilton Head Island Airport .

Interstates and highways 
Interstate 95 runs to the west of Bluffton and is connected to it by U.S. Route 278. Bluffton Parkway, currently under construction, is planned to run from the Hilton Head Island bridge to I-95 near Hardeeville when all phases are complete. As of August 2012, the parkway runs from SC-170 in the west almost to the bridge in the east. Two sections are currently separated by Buckwalter Parkway but are scheduled to be joined by Phase 5B. Local public transportation and dial-a-ride service is provided by Palmetto Breeze, a regional transportation authority run by the Lowcountry Council of Governments, which serves as the regional Metropolitan Planning Organization (MPO).

Major highways 
 (west of Bluffton)
 - Fording Island Road
 SC 170 – Okatie Highway
 SC 46 – May River Road
Bluffton Parkway

Fire department
The Bluffton Township Fire District was created in 1978, and is comprised all of the land in Beaufort County south of the Broad River except Jenkins Island, Hilton Head Island and Daufuskie Island. In 1994, Jenkins Island was added.

There are nine fire stations in the Bluffton Township Fire District.

Bluffton Township Fire District works with Hilton Head Island Fire & Rescue as a sponsoring agency for two of South Carolina's designated special teams: one of the state's Hazardous Materials/Weapons of Mass Destruction Response Teams and one of the four Regional Urban Search and Rescue Response Teams.

Police
The Town of Bluffton Police Department received national accreditation in 2009.  There is one police headquarters, providing operations, support, and neighborhood services.

Notable people
 Gus Dean, NASCAR driver
 Kitty Ferguson, science writer and lecturer
 Bill Workman, former town manager and economic development consultant

See also 

 List of municipalities in South Carolina
 South Carolina Lowcountry
 Sun City Hilton Head
 Bluffton Today
 The Island Packet

Notes

Works cited
 Huffman, Donna. A Guide to Historic Bluffton, 2007. Bluffton Historical Preservation Society, 2007. 80 pp.
 Howie, Stephen S. The Bluffton Charge: One Preacher's Struggle For Civil Rights, 2000. Mammoth Books, 2000. 237 pp.

External links

 
 
 Greater Bluffton Chamber of Commerce
 Hilton Head Island-Bluffton Chamber of Commerce and Visitor & Convention Bureau

 
Hilton Head Island–Beaufort micropolitan area
Towns in Beaufort County, South Carolina
Towns in South Carolina